Stefan Edberg was the defending champion, but lost in the semifinals to John McEnroe.

McEnroe won the title by defeating Jimmy Connors 7–6(8–6), 6–3 in the final.

Seeds

Draw

Finals

Top half

Bottom half

References

External links
 Official results archive (ATP)
 Official results archive (ITF)

1986 Grand Prix (tennis)